Ralte is a Kuki-Chin language of India. Fewer than a thousand Ralte people speak the language.

Geographical distribution
Ralte is spoken in the following locations (Ethnologue).

Mizoram (mainly Aizawl district, and also scattered in Lunglei district and Chhimtuipui district)
Manipur
Jampui Hills, North Tripura district, Tripura

Vocabulary
Below are comparative Swadesh lists of Ralte, Mizo, and Tedim from Otsuka (2016).

References

Otsuka, Kosei. 2016. A Basic Vocabulary and a Text of the Ralte Language. Asian and African Languages and Linguistics 10. 325–344.
Otsuka, Kosei. 2019. Verb stem alternation in Ralte. GENGO BUNKA KENKYU (STUDIES IN LANGUAGE AND CULTURE), Graduate School of Language and Culture Osaka University 45. 161–178.
Otsuka, Kosei. 2021. A phonological comparison of Ralte and Proto-Kuki-Chin. ARIAKE Kumamoto University Linguistic Papers 20. 21–38.

Kuki-Chin languages
Languages of Manipur
Languages of Mizoram
Languages of Tripura